The 2015–16 División de Plata de Balonmano is the 22nd season of second-tier handball competition in Spain.

The regular season was to begin in September 2015. After completing 30 matchdays, the top ranked team would be promoted to Liga ASOBAL, and each subsequently ranked team (2nd, 3rd, 4th and 5th) would compete in the promotion playoff for the one open spot in the Liga ASOBAL. The three bottom ranked teams would be relegated to Primera Estatal.

Competition rules 

The regular season competition would consist of 16 teams playing each other twice for a total of 30 matchdays. At the end of the regular season, the top ranked team in the standings would be promoted to Liga ASOBAL. Teams in 2nd, 3rd, 4th and 5th place would play each other in the promotion playoff for a single spot in Liga ASOBAL. The bottom three ranked teams would be relegated to Primera División Estatal.

Points during regular season are awarded as follows:

 The winner in each match would be awarded 2 points.
 A draw in any match would have 1 point awarded to each team.

Teams

 RGC Covadonga achieved the berth of the reserve team of BM Granollers, which resigned to play in División de Plata.

Regular season standings

Promotion playoffs
The promotion playoffs were played at Pabellón Polideportivo Artaleku, home of the top seeded team Bidasoa Irún on 4 and 5 June 2016.

The winner of this playoff promoted to Liga ASOBAL with the regular season champion Atlético Valladolid.

Bracket

References

External links
Regular season standings
Full schedule

División de Plata de Balonmano seasons
2015–16 in Spanish handball